The 2010–11 season was Portogruaro's 20th season of football and it is the first season in the Serie B, Italian second division.

Squad

Francesco Rossi
Matteo Lanzoni
Salvatore D'Elia
Filippo Cristante
Andrea Pisani
Adrian Madaschi
Vinicio Espinal
Daniele Mattielig
Christian Altinier
Marco Cunico
Piá
Nicolas Amodio
Luca Scapuzzi
Matteo Scozzarella
Ivan Franceschini
Alessandro Cibocchi
Emiliano Tarana
Gabriele Puccio
Denny Cardin
Andrea Bavena
Eros Schiavon
Riccardo Bocalon
Mirko Giacobbe
Federico Gerardi
Marco Esposito
Francesco Scarpa

Competitions

Standings

Coppa Italia

Second round

Third round

Transfers (1/7 - 1/9)

IN

OUT

Transfers 3/1 al 31/1

IN
Ivan Franceschini
Alessandro Cibocchi
Francesco Scarpa

References

External links

Italian football clubs 2010–11 season
A.S.D. Portogruaro seasons